This was a new event in 2012.

Samantha Crawford and Madison Keys won the title, defeating Xu Yifan and Zhou Yimiao in the final, 6–3, 2–6, [12–10].

Seeds

Draw

Draw

References
 Main Draw

ITF Women's Circuit - Yakima - Doubles